Dorotheus (secular name Ioannis Kottaras ) was Archbishop of Athens and All Greece from 1956 to 1957. He was born in Hydra in 1888 and studied theology at the University of Athens, from where he graduated in 1909. He then studied law at the Universities of Athens and Leipzig, and specialised in ecclesiastical law. For a brief period, he was a schoolteacher in Sparta.

He became a monk, and was ordained a deacon on 18 September 1910 by the then Metropolitan Bishop of Hydra and Spetses Ioasaph and served as a deacon for nine years in the Church of St George Carytses in Athens. On 18 December 1922 he was ordained a priest by the then Metropolitan Bishop of Hydra and Spetses Procopius. Two days later, he was ordained a bishop by the then Metropolitan Bishops of Fthiotida Ambrosius and Syros Athanasius, and was appointed Metropolitan Bishop of Kythera and Antikythera.

On 15 January 1935 he was transferred to the Metropolis of Larissa and Platamon from where he was appointed Archbishop of Athens and All Greece on 29 March 1956, succeeding Archbishop Spyridon.

He died in Stockholm on 26 July 1957. During his life, he wrote over forty treatises on ecclesiastical law.

1888 births
1957 deaths
People from Hydra (island)
Archbishops of Athens and All Greece
20th-century Eastern Orthodox archbishops
Bishops of Larissa